The 2002 Cyprus Rally (formally the 30th Cyprus Rally) was the fifth round of the 2002 World Rally Championship. The race was held over three days between 19 April and 21 April 2002, and was won by Peugeot's Marcus Grönholm, his 9th win in the World Rally Championship.

Background

Entry list

Itinerary
All dates and times are EEST (UTC+3).

Results

Overall

World Rally Cars

Classification

Special stages

Championship standings

Production World Rally Championship

Classification

Special stages

Championship standings

References

External links 
 Official website of the World Rally Championship

Cyprus
Cyprus Rally
2002 in Cypriot sport